The  is the nineteenth-tallest building in Osaka Prefecture, Japan, and one of the city's most recognizable landmarks. It consists of two 40-story towers that connect at their two uppermost stories, with bridges and an escalator crossing the wide atrium-like space in the center. It is located in Umeda district of Kita-ku, Osaka.

The building was originally conceived in 1988 as the "City of Air" project, which planned to create four interconnected towers in northern Osaka. Eventually, the Japan economic bubble of the 1980s burst and brought the number of towers down to two.

The 170 m (568 ft) building was designed by Hiroshi Hara. It was constructed by Takenaka Corporation and was completed in 1993.

The building features a rooftop observatory, The Floating Garden Observatory, as well as an underground market that attempts to recreate the atmosphere of Osaka in the early 20th century. At the base of the towers is an urban garden with walking trails and water features.

Ownership
The building was mainly owned by Toshiba Corporation through Toshiba Building Co., Ltd. In July 2008, Toshiba sold a majority stake (65%) in Toshiba Building to Nomura Real Estate co. but maintains a 35% ownership.

Tenants
Mazda has an office in the Umeda Sky Building Tower East. The German consulate-general is located on the thirty-fifth floor of the Umeda Sky Building Tower East. AstraZeneca have their Japanese and Asia-Pacific headquarters in the East Tower. PlatinumGames is also located in the building.

See also
List of tallest buildings in Osaka

References

External links

 Umeda Sky Building, Sekisui House Umeda Operation Co.
 Outline of Shin Umeda City, Sekisui House Umeda Operation Co.
 Umeda Sky Building, Takenaka Corporation
 Umeda Sky Building, Japan Guide

Office buildings completed in 1993
Tourist attractions in Osaka
Skyscrapers in Osaka
Twin towers
Umeda
Skyscraper office buildings in Japan
1993 establishments in Japan
Postmodern architecture in Japan